Validation therapy was developed by Naomi Feil for older people with cognitive impairments and dementia. Feil's own approach classifies individuals with cognitive impairment as having one of four stages in a continuum of dementia. These stages are: 
Mal orientation
Time confusion
Repetitive motion
Vegetative state.

The basic principle of the therapy is the concept of validation or the reciprocated communication of respect which communicates that the other's opinions are acknowledged, respected, heard, and (regardless whether or not the listener actually agrees with the content), they are being treated with genuine respect as a legitimate expression of their feelings, rather than marginalized or dismissed.

Validation therapy uses different specific techniques, and it has  attracted criticism from researchers who dispute the evidence for some of the beliefs and values of validation therapy, and the appropriateness of the techniques; as there are not enough quality evidences proving the efficacy of such method for people with dementia.

References

External links 
 Official website includes demonstration videos

Alzheimer's disease
Aging-associated diseases
Psychotherapies